Urum al-Sughra is a village in western Aleppo Governorate, northwestern Syria. With a population of 637 as per the 2004 census, the village administratively belongs to Nahiya Urum al-Kubrah in Atarib District.

Siege of Base 46 took place here in 2012.

References

Populated places in Atarib District
Villages in Aleppo Governorate